Cyerce elegans is a species of sacoglossan sea slug, a shell-less marine opisthobranch gastropod mollusk in the family Caliphyllidae.

References

External links 

 http://www.seaslugforum.net/cyereleg.htm

Caliphyllidae
Gastropods described in 1870